Idiochlora caudularia is a moth of the family Geometridae first described by Achille Guenée in 1857. It is found in Sri Lanka and South India.

References

Moths of Asia
Moths described in 1857